Harmon is a ghost town in the town of Stinnett, Washburn County, Wisconsin, United States. The town is said to be named after the well known politician from Newtown, Thomas Harmon Jr. The town was marked on USGS maps as late as 1947.

References 

Geography of Washburn County, Wisconsin
Ghost towns in Wisconsin